The Little Rock–Pine Bluff media market, which encompasses the state capital and two of the largest metropolitan areas in the U.S. state of Arkansas, maintains a variety of broadcast, print and online media outlets serving the region. As of September 2021, it is ranked as the 59th largest American television market by Nielsen Media Research and the 92nd largest American radio market by Nielsen Audio.

The Little Rock–Pine Bluff designated market area is served by 13 television stations (nine full-power and four low-power digital stations) and 54 radio stations (11 AM/MW stations, 28 full-power and five low-power FM stations, and 10 low-power FM translators) licensed to communities within  of downtown Little Rock, along with nine television stations (three full-power and six low-power digital stations) and 110 radio stations (17 AM/MW stations, 55 full-power and six low-power FM stations, and 32 low-power FM translators) serving counties outside of the core metropolitan area.

The following is a list of newspapers, magazines, radio, television, and online media that currently operate or have previously operated in Central Arkansas. In addition to referencing broadcast media outlets that serve the immediate Little Rock–North Little Rock–Conway and Pine Bluff metropolitan statistical areas (MSA), the article also lists television and radio stations licensed to non-metro counties within the broader Little Rock–Pine Bluff DMA.

Newspapers and magazines

The major daily newspaper published in Little Rock is the Arkansas Democrat-Gazette, which is circulated statewide and publishes standalone print and digital editions focusing on the Arkansas River Valley and Ozark regions from a satellite facility based in Lowell. Founded as the Arkansas Gazette by William E. Woodruff in November 1819, it was the first newspaper to begin publication in the then-Arkansas Territory and was originally published in the pre-statehood territorial capital of Arkansas Post, before relocating to Little Rock shortly after it became the capital city in 1821. The Gazette and the rival Arkansas Democrat were consolidated into a single publication in October 1991, after Gannett sold the Gazette, which had been in financial decline for several years, to Democrat parent WEHCO Media. The Democrat-Gazette transitioned from print delivery to offering digital-only replica editions of its Monday-Saturday editions statewide in 2019, though it continues to produce a Sunday print edition.

In addition to the Democrat-Gazette, a number of other regional and special-interest newspapers are published in the area such as the alternative weekly Arkansas Times and business publication Arkansas Business. Several local magazines are also published in the city, most of which maintain a focus on business, lifestyle or religious interests.

Daily
Arkansas Democrat-Gazette
 Daily Record (business, real estate and legal newspaper)

Weekly
 Air Scoop (published at Little Rock Air Force Base)
 Arkansas Business
 Arkansas Catholic (Religious newspaper published by the Roman Catholic Diocese of Little Rock)
 Arkansas Times
 Baptist Trumpet (Religious newspaper published by the Baptist Missionary Association of Arkansas)
 El Latino (Spanish-language weekly newspaper)
 Hola! Arkansas (Spanish-English bilingual newspaper)

Community

 Beebe News
 The Daily Citizen (Searcy)
 The Leader (Jacksonville)
 Log Cabin Democrat (Conway)
 Pine Bluff Commercial
 Saline Courier (Benton)
 Sheridan Headlight
 Sherwood Voice

College
 The Echo (student newspaper of the University of Central Arkansas)
 Frank: Academics for the Real World (public service publication operated by the University of Arkansas Clinton School of Public Service)
 UALR Forum (student newspaper of the University of Arkansas at Little Rock)

Business, legal, entertainment and other local periodicals

 501 Life Magazine
 Arkansas Bride (biannual magazine)
 Arkansas Flavor (food magazine)
 Arkansas Food and Farm (periodical focused on small farm agriculture and locally sourced foods)
 Arkansas Green Guide (annual magazine)
 Arkansas Life
 Arkansas Living Magazine
 Arkansas Money & Politics
 Arkansas Next - Money (biannual magazine)
 Arkansas Next PROS (biannual magazine)
 Arkansas Next: A Guide to Life After High School (annual magazine)
 Arkansas Total
 Arkansas Wild (outdoor magazine)
 Aspire Arkansas
 At Home in Arkansas
 AY Magazine
 ENGAGE Magazine
 Greenhead (annual magazine)
 Inviting Arkansas
 Lease Guide (annual magazine)
 Little Rock Beauty Black Book (annual magazine)
 Little Rock Family (monthly magazine)
 Little Rock Guest Guide (annual magazine)
 Little Rock Soirée (monthly magazine)
 Living in Arkansas (annual magazine)
 Meeting Planner (annual magazine)
 Metro Little Rock Guide (annual magazine)
 Oxford American
 Rural Arkansas Magazine
 Savvy Kids (family-oriented magazine)
 URBANE Magazine (Black-oriented lifestyle magazine)
 Venture

Defunct newspapers and publications

 The American Guide
 Arkansas Advocate
 Arkansas Banner
 Arkansas Carrier
 Arkansas Farmer
 Arkansas Freeman
 Arkansas Gazette
 Arkansas Mansion
 Arkansas Recorder
 Arkansas Star
 Arkansas State Press
 Arkansas Supreme Court Advance Sheets
 Arkansas Survey-Journal
 Arkansas Temperance Journal
 Arkansas Times and Advocate (formed through 1837 merger of the Arkansas Weekly Times and Arkansas Advocate newspapers)
 Arkansas Traveller (Ku Klux Klan newspaper published in Little Rock and El Dorado)
 Arkansas Tribune
 Arkansas Union Labor Bulletin
 Arkansas Weekly Sentinel
 Arkansas Weekly Times
 The Arkansas World
 Cabot Star-Herald (Cabot)
 Daily Legal News
 Daily Republican
 Das Arkansas Echo (German language newspaper)
 Independent Democrat
 Inclusion Magazine
 Legislative Digest
 Little Rock Free Press
 National Democrat (Unionist Civil War newspaper)
 North Little Rock Times
 Pine Bluff Weekly Herald
 Political Intelligencer
 Spectrum Weekly
 Spirit of the Age
 True Democrat
 Unconditional Union
 Woman's Chronicle

Digital media
Talk Business & Politics

Television

The first television station to operate in Arkansas, KRTV (channel 17), signed on from Little Rock on April 4, 1953; however, the station faltered mainly because it transmitted on the then-unviable UHF band, as television sets were not required to be manufactured with built-in UHF tuners at the time of its sign-on (requiring a more expensive external tuner to be able to view KRTV's signal). In April 1954, KRTV forfeited its license to the Federal Communications Commission and sold its studio facility to Central-South Sales Co. to serve as an auxiliary studio for the state's first VHF station, KATV (channel 7), which began operations in Pine Bluff in December 1953 and moved its city of license to Little Rock in 1958. KETS (channel 2) signed on as the state's first educational station on December 4, 1966; between 1976 and 2006, the Arkansas Educational Television Commission (a statutory non-cabinet state agency operated through the Arkansas Department of Education) expanded its Little Rock-based station into a statewide education television network, now known as Arkansas PBS, signing on five satellite stations to provide educational programming throughout Arkansas.

Most of the transmitters belonging to television and radio stations in the area are located atop Shinall Mountain, just west of the immediate Little Rock city limits and near its Chenal Valley neighborhood; transmitter facilities for certain other area broadcasters are maintained near Redfield in Jefferson County.

Local broadcast stations

Outlying areas
Areas outside the immediate Little Rock–Pine Bluff metropolitan statistical area are served by mostly low-power stations (a few of which transmit into Little Rock proper), with the exceptions of three full-power stations, two of which operate as satellite stations of the Arkansas PBS network and one acting as a satellite of the locally programmed religious Victory Television Network.

Defunct stations

Local independent cable channels
 Little Rock Television (public, educational, and government access (PEG) channel)
 LRSD TV (public, educational, and government access (PEG) channel, operated by the Little Rock School District)
 North Little Rock Government TV (public, educational, and government access (PEG) channel)
 University of Central Arkansas – Channel 6 (public, educational, and government access (PEG) channel; Conway)
 University Television (public, educational, and government access (PEG) channel, operated by the University of Arkansas at Little Rock)

Subscription television
Subscription television service in the Little Rock Metropolitan Statistical Area (MSA) is primarily provided by Comcast (for cable television) and AT&T U-verse (for Internet Protocol television). Cable television service in Pulaski County began in 1973, with service divided between Arkansas Cable Television in suburban Little Rock, North Little Rock Cablevision in North Little Rock (which would be acquired by Times Mirror Cablevision in 1977), Television Inc. in the suburbs of North Little Rock and Sherwood, and Sherwood Cablevision in Sherwood; they would later be joined by Riverside Cable in Little Rock in 1980. Cable service was established in Pine Bluff the year prior through Television Communications Corp.-owned Pine Bluff Video (subsequently renamed Pine Bluff Cable TV). Conway Corporation, which also provided electricity, water and telephone service to residents in Conway, began offering cable service in 1979.

Arkansas Cable Television became part of Storer Cable in 1979; Storer expanded into North Little Rock and Jacksonville in July 1985, as part of a system swap—then the largest system trade in cable television history—that resulted in Storer also acquiring Times-Mirror's cable systems in Louisville, Kentucky and Point Pleasant Beach, New Jersey, and Times-Mirror acquiring Storer-owned systems in Phoenix, Paradise Valley and Mesa, Arizona, and Laguna Beach, California. Storer's Central Arkansas systems became part of Comcast (which had been operating Storer Cable under a joint venture with Tele-Communications, Inc. since 1988) in June 1994.

Radio

WOK was the first radio station in Arkansas, founded by Arkansas Power & Light Co. (AP&L) founder Harvey Couch and debuting in Pine Bluff on February 18, 1922. In its two-year existence, among other firsts, it became the first broadcaster in Arkansas to broadcast a sermon (presented by Little Rock-based Missionary Baptist minister Ben Bogard, whose program often promoted Initiated Act 1, a proposed legislative ban on the teaching of evolution), to broadcast a sports event (an October 1922 high school football game between Pine Bluff and
Prescott high schools), and to broadcast a concert (conducted during the station's inaugural broadcast by The Federation of Music Clubs of Arkansas). The non-commercial station was entirely financially supported by AP&L, ultimately becoming a financial drain on the utility company, the limited number of frequencies then available led to complaints of WOK's signal causing interference with other stations. WOK ceased operations in June 1923 and its license was terminated by the FCC in June 1924. (Couch loaned WOK's equipment to help start a student-run station at Henderson-Brown College in Arkadelphia, where he was a trustee board member, in February 1924.) The first radio station in Little Rock was WSV, which debuted on April 8, 1922. Little Rock's first continuous radio station, KLRA (1470 AM, later on 1420 and then 1010 AM), began in Fort Smith as WLBN in June 1927 and was reassigned to Little Rock in January 1928 (after having broadcast from the city since the previous October). The station, which would become a CBS Radio affiliate in 1929, employed an on-staff band for live in-studio broadcasts and often conducted remote broadcasts. KLRA-AM would remain popular into the 1980s and was among the last Little Rock stations with a staff of full-time news reporters.

KAAY (1090 AM) began operations on 800 AM in Hot Springs in December 1924; the station, which became an NBC Blue (later ABC Radio) affiliate in March 1929 and switched to CBS Radio in June 1953 (along with a short-lived secondary Mutual affiliation from 1938 to 1939), was reassigned to Little Rock—following an aborted attempt in 1949 to relocate it to West Memphis—and became the state's first 50,000-watt clear channel station—relocating its transmitter to a tower in Wrightsville, which produced a nighttime signal that covered much of the Great Plains and Mississippi Valley regions and could be received as far as parts of Cuba—in March 1953. Following its 1962 purchase by LIN Broadcasting, the rechristened KAAY switched to an innovative mixed format for the time of top 40 music, news and agricultural reports, and religious programs; KAAY became known for its Arkansas Razorbacks football broadcasts and for being the originating station of Beaker Street, an underground music program that gained a cult following throughout the Central United States during its 1966–72 run. After earlier attempts to shift to adult contemporary, country music and oldies, following its sale to Beasley Broadcasting Group in 1985, KAAY adopted a religious format consisting of Southern gospel music and brokered religious programs, which it maintains to this day.

KOKY (1440 AM) signed on as a daytime-only station in October 1956; as the first Arkansas radio station to employ an African American staff and to feature programming directed towards a Black audience, it gained a following among Little Rock's Black community due partly to the station's direct community involvement, including hosting and sponsoring various events throughout the city. Programming focused on Black rock-and-roll, blues and R&B music, religious programming (including several programs hosted by KOKY religious director R.L. Weaver, who became known as the "Top Religious Radio Personality in Arkansas") and specialty programs (such as Teen Time, a Saturday afternoon program hosted by Bill Hill, then a student at the city's Horace Mann High School). One of the station's DJs, Al Bell (who would later become an executive at Stax Records), regularly visited local restaurants, barbershops and record stores in the city's Black neighborhoods to help influence the content on his programs around the community's musical interests and tastes. (The station, now KTUV, switched to a Spanish-language variety format in 2006; the KOKY call letters and format—which also incorporates the all-day Saturday blues and Sunday gospel blocks that originated on the AM station—now reside on 102.1 FM.)

The Arkansas Radio Network (ARN) syndication service was founded in Little Rock in 1967 as the Delta Farm Network, originating as an early-morning program hosted by Bob Buice (who was then farm news director at KARK-FM [103.7 FM, now KABZ] and also conducted farm reports for KARK-TV). Utilizing news staff from KARK radio (920 AM, now KARN), general manager Ted Snider founded ARN following his 1971 purchase of the KARK radio stations from the Arkansas Radio & Equipment Company (which concurrently sold KARK-TV to Mullins Broadcasting) and expanded its offerings to include statewide news, weather and sports updates as well as specialty programs, along with its agricultural reports. By the late 1980s, ARN programming was distributed to nearly 70 radio stations across Arkansas. On February 21, 2022, Cumulus Media (which acquired ARN through its 2011 purchase of Citadel Broadcasting) announced plans to suspend the network's operations effective March 20.

AM

FM

Outlying areas
Areas outside the immediate Little Rock metropolitan statistical area are served by radio stations of various formats (which include some stations which have signals that propagate into Little Rock proper):

NOAA Weather Radio
All NOAA Weather Radio stations serving the Little Rock market are operated by the National Weather Service office based in North Little Rock.

See also
 Arkansas media
 List of newspapers in Arkansas
 List of radio stations in Arkansas
 List of television stations in Arkansas
 Media of cities in Arkansas: Fayetteville, Fort Smith, Hot Springs, Little Rock, Rogers

References

Notes
Because of this, KMYA relies on the Sheridan translator, and on cable and satellite distribution to cover Central Arkansas.
2 Indicates clear-channel station with extended nighttime coverage.

Bibliography
 
 
 
 
 
 
 
 
 
  (Includes information about newspapers)

External links
 Little Rock Media List
 Arkansas Newspaper List
 
 . (Includes bibliography)
 
  (Directory ceased in 2017)
 
 
 
 
 

Little Rock
Mass media in Little Rock, Arkansas
Mass media in Arkansas